Jackson is a town in Teton County, Wyoming, United States. The population was 10,760 at the 2020 census, up from 9,577 in 2010. It is the largest town in Teton County and its county seat. Jackson is the principal town of the Jackson, WY-ID Micropolitan Statistical Area, which includes Teton County in Wyoming and Teton County in Idaho. The town, often mistakenly called Jackson Hole, derives its name from the valley in which it is located. Jackson is a popular tourist destination due to its proximity to the ski resorts Jackson Hole Mountain, Snow King Mountain, and Grand Targhee, as well as Grand Teton National Park and Yellowstone National Park.

History
Jackson was originally populated by Native American tribes including the Shoshoni, Crow, Blackfeet, Bannock, and Gros Ventre. In the early 1800s, the locality became a prime area for trappers and mountain men to travel through, one example being John Colter. After being discharged from the Corps of Discovery of the Lewis and Clark Expedition in 1806 at Fort Mandan, in present-day North Dakota, Colter visited Jackson Hole during the winter of 1807/1808. Among other mountain men who visited the valley include Jim Bridger, Jedediah Smith, and William Sublette, who are responsible for many of the names in the area. David Edward Jackson gave his name to the valley after a winter spent on the shores of Jackson Lake.

As part of the Hayden Expedition of 1871 and 1872, William Henry Jackson took the first photographs of the Teton Mountains and Yellowstone.  His photographs, along with the sketches by Tom Moran, were important evidence to convince Congress to protect Yellowstone National Park.  Yellowstone National Park became the first National Park in 1872.  Grand Teton National Park was created in 1929 and greatly expanded in 1950 through the generous efforts of John D. Rockefeller, Jr., who purchased and then donated over 30,000 acres.

The Town of Jackson was named in 1894 and incorporated in 1914. Some of the early buildings remain and can be found throughout the area of the Town Square. 

The Town of Jackson elected an all-woman city government (including town council and mayor, who in turn appointed women to town marshal, town clerk and treasurer) in 1920.

The first ski rope tow was built at Teton Pass in 1937 and Snow King Resort was established in 1930.  Teton County now has three excellent ski areas including Jackson Hole Mountain Resort in Teton Village, Grand Targhee Ski and Summer Resort located on the West slope of the Tetons, and Snow King Resort.

The Town of Jackson is the county seat of Teton County and the only incorporated municipality in the region.  Less than 3% of land in Teton County is privately owned.  97% of the 2,697,000 acres in Teton County are federally or state owned/managed.

In 2009, the Town of Jackson was designated as a Preserve America Community. This designation recognizes that, as a community, the town protects and celebrates its heritage, uses historic assets for economic development and encourages people to experience and appreciate local historic resources.

In September 2016, the town went viral from an ongoing live stream on YouTube consisting of various views of the town, especially a webcam angled on the town square. Notable interests were the abundance of red trucks in the streets and a sheriff performing the dab in front of the live webcam. To date, the webcam is still operational.

Geography

Jackson is surrounded by the Teton and Gros Ventre mountain ranges.  The Teton Range is commonly associated with Jackson Hole and is a popular sightseeing attraction for many visitors.  The Gros Ventre Range, by contrast, is geologically older than the Tetons and has a much broader width, which encompasses huge expanses of wilderness and is not as easily accessible.

Soils at Jackson Hole are mostly dark, excessively drained, moderately alkaline gravelly loam of the Greyback series.

Flat Creek, a tributary of the Snake River, runs through the town.

Climate
Jackson experiences a humid continental climate (Köppen Dfb), with warm summers and very cold winters. Due to its location in a very narrow river valley, Jackson and the rest of the Snake headwaters experience a unique microclimate that gets considerably more precipitation – much of it snow – than the majority of Wyoming and has higher humidity during much of the year. Its elevation is also responsible for extreme differences between day and night temperatures, which makes the climate very close to being classified as subarctic (Köppen Dfc).

Snowfall averages , but the highest monthly total has been  in January 1969, and the most in one season being  between July 1966 and June 1967.

Demographics

As of 2000 the median income for a household in the town was $59,605, and the median income for a family was $69,432. Male full-time, year-round workers had a median income of $35,892 versus $29,175 for females. The per capita income for the town was $27,066. About 4.2% of families and 6.4% of the population were below the poverty line, including 6.7% of those under age 18.

2010 census
As of the census of 2010, there were 9,577 people, 3,964 households, and 1,858 families residing in the town. The racial makeup of the town was 79.8% White, 0.4% African American, 0.8% Native American, 1.4% Asian, 0.1% Pacific Islander, 15.2% from other races, and 2.3% from two or more races. Hispanics or Latinos of any race were 27.2% of the population.

There were 3,964 households, of which 24.7% had children under the age of 18 living with them, 35.2% were married couples living together, 6.6% had a female householder with no husband present, 5.0% had a male householder with no wife present, and 53.1% were non-families. 31.9% of all households were made up of individuals, and 5.3% had someone living alone who was 65 years of age or older. The average household size was 2.39 and the average family size was 3.04.

The median age in the town was 31.9 years. 18% of residents were under the age of 18; 11.6% were between the ages of 18 and 24; 43.8% were from 25 to 44; 20.5% were from 45 to 64; and 6.2% were 65 years of age or older. The gender makeup of the town was 54.1% male and 45.9% female.

Economy
As of the 2010 Census, the main industries which provide employment are: arts, entertainment, recreation, accommodation and food services (32.2%), construction (8.7%), retail trade (12.4%), educational services, health care and social assistance (11.9%), and professional, scientific, and management, and administrative and waste management services (11.8%).

A strong local economy, primarily due to tourism, has allowed Jackson to develop a large shopping and eating district characterized by a large number of art galleries, custom jewelers, and designer clothing retailers centered on the town square.

Points of interest 
 Grand Teton National Park: A national park that includes the Teton Mountain Range, roughly 310,000 acres. The park brings in more than two million recreational tourists each year. The Grand Teton National Park is roughly 5 miles away from Jackson.
 Yellowstone National Park:  Mostly in Wyoming, Yellowstone also extends into Idaho and Montana. This park was the first national park in the country, and brings in roughly four million visitors each year. This park is less than 60 miles away from Jackson.
 National Elk Refuge: The refuge was created to shelter one of the largest elk herds in the country and borders the town of Jackson. Throughout the winter visitors can go on horse-drawn sleigh rides to view the herd.
 Jackson Hole Mountain Resort: The resort opened in 1966, 12 miles north of Jackson. It has abundant steep terrain and has one of the highest vertical drops in North America, at 4,139 feet (1,262 m).
 Snow King Mountain Resort: The first ski resort in Jackson and is significantly cheaper than Jackson Hole Mountain Resort. Even though Snow King is cheaper it is still quite a challenging hill. This resort is located on the Southeast edge of town. 400+ acres of skiable terrain with 3 chairlifts and a high speed summit gondola
 Grand Targhee Resort: About an hour away, 42 miles, on the west side of the Teton Range in Alta, opened in 1969, it is accessed through Idaho over Teton Pass. 
 National Museum of Wildlife Art: Overlooking the National Elk Refuge is the National Museum of Wildlife Art which shows and preserves many wildlife artworks. Along with pieces inside of the museum, there is a ¾ mile trail with many sculptures along it.
 Grand Teton Music Festival: This is a seven-week classical music festival held every summer in the town of Jackson.
 Center for the Arts: The center was founded in 1991 to help support an artist culture within the town. Construction of the facility was completed in 2007.
Elkfest: The annual Jackson Hole Elk Antler Auction occurs each spring. At this event, members of the Boy Scouts of America help sell all the antlers collected on the nearby National Elk Refuge. Profits go to help the local Boy Scouts and the refuge.

Government
Jackson is administered by a mayor and town council.  The current mayor is Hailey Morton Levinson.

The following are currently members of the Town Council: Arne Jorgensen (vice mayor), Jessica Sell Chambers, Jim Rooks, and Jonathan Schechter.

Education
Public education in the town of Jackson is provided by Teton County School District #1. Schools serving the town include Jackson Elementary School (grades K–5), Colter Elementary School (grades K–5), Munger Mountain Elementary, Jackson Hole Middle School (grades 6–8), Jackson Hole High School, Summit Innovations High School, the Jackson Hole Classical Academy (grades K–10), Jackson Hole Community School and the Journeys School.

Jackson has a public library, a branch of the Teton County Library. The 1938 Teton County Library, which is a rustic log cabin, is on the National Register of Historic Places. The building now houses the Huff Memorial Library.

Transportation
Jackson lies at the junction of US 26/US 89/US 189/US 191 and Wyoming Highway 22 (the Teton Pass Highway).

The town is served by Jackson Hole Airport, the busiest airport in the state of Wyoming. A public bus system ("The START Bus", or Southern Teton Area Rapid Transit) services the town of Jackson, the route to Teton Village, and adjacent communities in Star Valley, Wyoming and Teton Valley, Idaho. There are also airport buses to Salt Lake City, and places in between.

Jackson Hole Economic Policy Symposium

Since 1978, the Kansas City Federal Reserve Bank has held an annual economic summit at Jackson (Hole) that is globally known as the Jackson Hole Economic Summit or officially as the "Jackson Hole Economic Policy Symposium". Attendees include prominent central bankers, finance ministers and academics from around the world.

In popular culture

Movies shot in Jackson include The Big Trail (1930), The Big Sky (1952), Shane (1953), Any Which Way You Can (1980), Rocky IV (1985), Ghosts Can't Do It (1990), and Django Unchained (2012). It is also a major location in the action-adventure video game The Last of Us (2013) and its sequel (2020), in which it is home to a large community of survivors in a post-apocalyptic world; however, scenes set in Jackson in the game's television adaptation (2022) were instead shot in the Canadian town of Canmore, Alberta, which doubled for Jackson.

Jackson has gained notabilty since a livestream of its town square went viral on YouTube in 2016, leading to much fascination with the town's elk antler arches and unusually high prevalence of red pickup trucks. It first went viral when a sheriff stopped at a red light in the early hours of the morning, got out of his patrol car, and dabbed towards the camera before leaving.

Notable people
 Tom Chrystie (1933–2013), banker who served as the first Chief Financial Officer of Merrill Lynch & Company and industry pioneer who created the Cash Management Account
Harrison Ford (born 1942), actor
 Clifford Hansen (1912–2009), 26th Governor of Wyoming
 Mary Mead (1935–1996), rancher, businesswoman, politician
 Matt Mead (born 1962), attorney, businessman, politician
 Milward Simpson (1897–1993), 23rd Governor of Wyoming
 Lyle Waggoner (1935–2020), actor, sculptor, presenter, travel trailer salesman, model; known for his work on The Carol Burnett Show
 Christy Walton (born 1949), widow of John T. Walton, one of the sons of Sam Walton, the founder of Walmart
 John Franklyn Mars (born 1935),  businessman and heir to the Mars candy company fortune
 Aaron Linsdau (born 1973), adventurer living in Jackson, Wyoming; known for the longest solo expedition from Hercules Inlet to the South Pole
 Affie Ellis (c. 1980), politician who served in the Wyoming Senate from the 8th district as a member of the Republican Party
Sandra Bullock (born 1964), actress
Travis Rice (born 1982), professional snowboarder
Jimmy Chin (born 1973), professional climber, photographer, and Academy Award-winning film director; directed, alongside his wife, E. Chai Vasarhelyi, Free Solo

See also
 Angling in Yellowstone National Park
 Blacktail Butte
 Flat Creek Ranch
 Jackson-Wilson High School
 Wyoming Outdoor Council

References

External links

 
 Museum of Jackson Hole

 
Towns in Teton County, Wyoming
Towns in Wyoming
County seats in Wyoming
Jackson, Wyoming micropolitan area